Giacomo Natoli (born 27 August 1846) was an Italian cavalry officer. He was three times sindaco or mayor of Messina, in the Mediterranean island of Sicily. On 11 March 1889 he obtained ministerial recognition of the title of nobility 'Barone di Scaliti'.

References 

19th-century Italian politicians
1846 births
Year of death missing